Engodactylactis is a genus of cnidarians belonging to the family Cerianthidae.

Species:
 Engodactylactis formosa (Gravier, 1920)

References

Cerianthidae
Anthozoa genera